Unnam is a 2012 Indian Malayalam-language film directed by Sibi Malayil, starring Lal, Asif Ali and Sreenivasan.

The film is an official remake of the 2007 Hindi film Johnny Gaddaar  which itself was an uncredited adaptation of the 1963 French movie Symphonie Pour Un Massacre (The Corrupt) by Jacques Deray which in turn was based on the 1962 French crime novel Les Mystifies by Alain Reynaud Fourton.

Synopsis 
A gang of five gamblers tries to crack a deal that will earn them a huge sum of money. However, things get complicated when one of them alters the plan.

Cast
 Sreenivasan as Balakrishna
 Lal as Kalapuraickal Sunny
 Asif Ali as Aloshy Andrews
 Nedumudi Venu as Murugan
 Prashant Narayanan as Tomy Eappan
 Rima Kallingal as Jennifer/Jenni/Maya
 Swetha Menon as Sereena
 Chitra Iyer as Padma
 Rajesh Hebbar as Vikraman
 Sasi Kalinga  as Kammatam Lopez
 Chembil Ashokan
 KPAC Lalitha as Basheer's mother

Awards

References

External links
 
 Asif Ali and Siby Malayil Again with Unnam

Malayalam remakes of Hindi films
2010s Malayalam-language films
Films scored by John P. Varkey
Films directed by Sibi Malayil